Papa is a 2016 Chinese family comedy-drama, a dramedy film directed by Xiao Zheng starring lead actor Xia Yu. The film was entirely shot in Los Angeles and Las Vegas and was released theatrically in China and in United States on the same day.

Synopsis
A bumbling Chinese talent manager travels to Los Angeles to retrieve his singer who fled to elope mid-tour. Instead of retrieving his singer, his futile attempts land him an arranged marriage with five adopted kids and an angry boss demanding his investment back. In his quest to reclaim fame and fortune, papa learns an important lesson in what it means to be a family.

The film follows a plot similar to a 2012 South Korean film, also named Papa.

Cast
Xia Yu as Huang Bo Lun
Song Zuer as Coco
Chloe Perrin as Alice
Sage Correa as A.K.
Jake Elliott as Peter
Anjini Taneja Azhar as Katie
Yang Zi
David Wu
Mike Sui Kai
Shan Jiang
Hu Bing
Macy Gray
Emily Kinney
Dennis Oh as Jason Chen
Candice Zhao
Brother Sway

References

External links

2016 films
Chinese comedy-drama films
Films shot in Los Angeles
2010s Mandarin-language films